Pierre de Chaignon la Rose (April 23, 1871 – February 21, 1941) was an American heraldist and heraldic artist.

Biography
Pierre de Chaignon la Rose was born on April 23, 1871, in New York City, New York. His father was Anthime F. la Rose, and his mother Katharine Kappus von Pichlstein.

La Rose studied at Exeter Academy and subsequently Harvard University, from which he graduated with a Bachelor of Arts in 1895. He was a member of Phi Beta Kappa, supposedly "without ever taking a single lecture-note". He also served as editor of the Harvard Monthly, and was a member of Hasty Pudding and Signet. His roommate at Harvard was Daniel Gregory Mason, who described him in the following terms:

Of all my friends he had the surest nose for the best, whether in letters, music, the graphic arts, or the more general arts of life ... His style in college essays and stories was fairly Jamesian. He could draw exquisite book-plates. As for his piano-playing, I can see him yet at our upright, stocky but erect in shirt-sleeves and red hair ...

He taught at Harvard in the English department for seven years following his graduation, resigning his teaching post in 1902. By 1915, La Rose would describe his occupation as a "man of letters", busying himself with critical literary work and graphic design while making trips to Europe, Mexico, and Turkey.

A fervent Catholic, La Rose was an expert on ecclesiastical heraldry, and designed the coats of arms of many American Catholic prelates. He also designed arms for institutions both Catholic and secular, including The Catholic University of America, Saint Anselm College and Rice University. For example, he designed the seals of all the graduate schools at Harvard University and  served on its Committee on Arms, Seal, and Diplomas, while also designing armorial bearings for Princeton, Yale, and Radcliffe College. He also designed the flag of the Episcopal Church between 1937 and 1940.

He was a friend of philosopher George Santayana.

A 1941 recollection of him in the Harvard Crimson noted his dignified presence on campus in his later years, but also his isolation and loneliness; La Rose never married. He died on February 21, 1941, at Wyman Cambridge Hospital in Cambridge, Massachusetts.

Armorial bearings designed

La Rose designed the armorial bearings for the following persons and institutions:

Institutions
The Catholic University of America
Duquesne University (modified and approved)
Harvard University's Graduate Schools
Lancaster Catholic High School
Rice University
Roman Catholic Archdiocese of Dubuque
Roman Catholic Archdiocese of Los Angeles
Roman Catholic Archdiocese of New Orleans
Roman Catholic Diocese of Natchez (now suppressed)
Roman Catholic Diocese of Pittsburgh
Roman Catholic Diocese of Saint Augustine
Roman Catholic Diocese of Saint Cloud
Roman Catholic Diocese of Toledo
Saint Anselm Abbey Shield, which is also a part of the modern day seal of Saint Anselm College in Goffstown, New Hampshire.
St. Edward Seminary
Coat of arms of the University of Notre Dame
University of Chicago

Persons
James Blenk (1856–1917), Archbishop of New Orleans
Joseph Francis Busch (1866–1953), Bishop of Saint Cloud
Regis Canevin (1853–1927), Bishop of Pittsburgh
John Patrick Carroll (1864–1925), Bishop of Helena
Michael Joseph Curley (1879–1947), Bishop of Saint Augustine
Dennis Joseph Dougherty (1865–1951), Archbishop of Philadelphia
John Edward Gunn (1863–1924), Bishop of Natchez
James Keane (1857–1929), Archbishop of Dubuque
Joseph Schrembs (1866–1945), Bishop of Toledo

References

External links
UNCG American Publishers' Trade Bindings: Pierre La Rose

1871 births
1941 deaths
Artists from New York City
Harvard University alumni
American heraldists
Phillips Exeter Academy alumni